The 1905 Central Michigan Normalites football team represented Central Michigan Normal School, later renamed Central Michigan University, as an independent during the 1905 college football season. Football returned to the school after having been discontinued for the 1904 season due to budgetary constraints. Charles Tambling was the team's coach.  The team compiled a 7–1 record, including victories over Michigan State Normal, later renamed Eastern Michigan University (13–0), the Elsie Giants (5–0), Ferris (35–2 and 10–0), and the Midland Athletic Club (51–0). The team's only loss was suffered on November 4, 1904, by a 12–6 score against Alma College at Mount Pleasant, Michigan.

Schedule

References

Central Michigan
Central Michigan Chippewas football seasons
Central Michigan Normalites football